Lukijan Mušicki (27 January 1777 – 15 March 1837) was a Serbian Orthodox bishop, writer and poet. From 1828 he was bishop of Karlovac, now in Croatia.

References

Further reading 

 Jovan Skerlić, Istorija nove srpske književnosti/The History of New Serbian Literature, Belgrade, 1914, 1921, pages 138–143; six pages dedicated to Lukijan Mušicki, poet, aesthete, translator, polyglot, and bishop.

1777 births
1837 deaths
Serbian Orthodox clergy
Serbian male poets
People from Temerin
Habsburg Serbs
19th-century Serbian people
History of the Serbian Orthodox Church in Croatia
Matica srpska